Winnemucca (YTB-785) was a United States Navy  named for Winnemucca, Nevada. She was the second navy ship to bear the name.

Construction

The contract for Winnemucca was awarded 31 January 1964. She was laid down on 23 September 1965 at Marinette, Wisconsin, by Marinette Marine and launched 23 December 1965.

Operational history
Winnemucca was initially assigned to the 5th Naval District and operated in the Norfolk, Virginia area until the following spring. Reassigned at that time to Vietnam, she arrived in that country on 10 June 1967 and, for the remainder of America's involvement in the Vietnam War, she served with Task Force 117, the Mobile Riverine Force. During her almost six years of combat operations on the rivers and in the swamps of South Vietnam, Winnemucca earned two Presidential Unit Citations, four Navy Unit Commendations, and 13 campaign stars.

In 1973, she was reassigned to the 17th Naval District and operated out of Adak, Alaska. That tour of duty ended late in 1975 when she began service at San Francisco, attached to the 12th Naval District.

Stricken from the Navy List 22 December 2003, she was sold, 21 January 2004, by Defense Reutilization and Marketing Service (DRMS) for reuse/conversion to LMW Investments Inc. Chula Vista, CA. for $67,822. Converted to civilian use, ex-Winnemucca was renamed Noelani and provides tug services from San Francisco, California.

References

External links
 

 

Natick-class large harbor tugs
1965 ships
Ships built by Marinette Marine